Gillingham railway station is on the Chatham Main Line in England, serving the town of Gillingham, Kent.

The station and most trains that call are operated by Southeastern. Following a timetable change on Sunday 20 May 2018, some trains are also operated by Govia Thameslink. It is commonly suffixed as Gillingham (Kent) to distinguish it from the similarly named station in Dorset.

The station first opened in 1858. It currently has three platforms (two for London-bound services and one for country-bound services) and a passenger lift from the station entrance to the platforms.

The station underwent an extensive facelift between 2010 and 2012. This included a new entrance, better pavements, new roof, refurbished waiting rooms, and new cycle storage units.

Services

The typical off-peak service in trains per hour is:

 1 tph to London St Pancras International
 2 tph to  via  and 
 2 tph to 
 1 tph to  via 
 2 tph to 

References

External links
Southeastern Railway - Gillingham (Kent) Station

Railway stations in Medway
DfT Category C1 stations
Former London, Chatham and Dover Railway stations
Railway stations in Great Britain opened in 1858
Railway stations served by Southeastern
Gillingham, Kent
Train driver depots in England
Railway stations served by Govia Thameslink Railway